This is a list of Swedish supercentenarians (people from Sweden who have attained the age of at least 110 years). The Gerontology Research Group (GRG) has validated the age claims of 18 supercentenarians from Sweden (including 3 emigrants), the oldest of whom is Astrid Zachrison, who died the night of her 113th birthday (15 May 2008).

Swedish supercentenarians

Notes

See also 

 List of supercentenarians in the Nordic countries

References 

Sweden